The 1934 Mannin Moar (formally known as II Mannin Moar) was a Grand Prix that was held on 2 June 1934 at a street circuit in Douglas, Isle of Man, United Kingdom. It was the twelfth round of the 1934 Grand Prix season, but it did not count towards the championship. The race, contested over 50 laps of 3.659 mi, or 5.889 km, was won by Brian Lewis driving an Alfa Romeo Tipo B after starting from pole position.

Entries

 DNS = Did Not Start

Starting positions

Race report
Rose-Richards made the best start of the line, overtaking both Staniland and Dixon to get into second place after Lewis, who would eventually stay in the lead the entire race. Staniland retired after just two laps due to gearbox problems and Rose-Richards retired with a broken water pump, leaving second and third place open for Dixon and Sameiro.

Between lap fifteen and lap forty, five drivers were forced to retire and the field was brought down to three cars. Although it was not an easy victory - his Alfa Romeo had lost a gear early in the race - Lewis took the flag after fifty laps ahead of Dodson and Paul.

Race results

Sources
 The R.A.C. Mannin
 www.kolumbus.fi, 1934 Mannin Moar
 www.kolumbus.fi, Drivers - The page of each aforementioned driver was consulted.
 www.isle-of-man.com, Douglas Street Circuit
 Racing Sports Cars, Drivers - The page of each aforementioned driver was consulted.

Motorsport in the Isle of Man
1934 in British motorsport
1934 in Grand Prix racing
Motor